Havre City–County Airport  is a public use airport located three nautical miles (6 km) west of the central business district of Havre, a city in Hill County, Montana, United States. It is owned by the City of Havre and Hill County. The airport is served by one commercial airline, subsidized by the Essential Air Service program.

As per the Federal Aviation Administration, this airport had 180 passenger boardings (enplanements) in calendar year 2008, 744 in 2009, and 961 in 2010. The National Plan of Integrated Airport Systems for 2011–2015 categorized it as a general aviation airport (the commercial service category requires 2,500 enplanements per year, and Havre does not have that).

Scheduled air service temporarily ceased on March 8, 2008, when Big Sky Airlines ended operations in bankruptcy. Great Lakes Airlines was given United States Department of Transportation approval to take over Essential Air Service (EAS) and flights began in 2009. The airport is now served by Cape Air under EAS contract.

Facilities and aircraft 
Havre City–County Airport covers an area of 720 acres (291 ha) at an elevation of 2,591 feet (790 m) above mean sea level. It has two asphalt paved runways: 8/26 is 5,205 by 100 feet (1,586 x 30 m) and 3/21 is 3,699 by 60 feet.

For the 12-month period ending December 31, 2011, the airport had 7,994 aircraft operations, an average of 21 per day: 85% general aviation, 14% air charter, and 1% military. At that time 20 aircraft were based at this airport: 95% single-engine and 5% multi-engine.

Airline and destination 

The following airline offers scheduled passenger service:

Statistics

References

Other sources

 Essential Air Service documents (Docket DOT-OST-1997-2605) from the U.S. Department of Transportation:
 Order 2005-12-20 (December 30, 2005): selecting Big Sky Transportation Co., d/b/a Big Sky Airlines, to continue providing essential air service at seven Montana communities (Glasgow, Glendive, Havre, Lewistown, Miles City, Sidney, and Wolf Point) for a new two-year period beginning March 1, 2006...
 Order 2007-11-21 (November 26, 2007): selecting Big Sky Transportation Co., d/b/a Big Sky Airlines, to continue providing essential air service at seven Montana communities for a new two-year period beginning March 1, 2008...
 Order 2007-12-22 (December 21, 2007): allowing Big Sky Transportation Co., d/b/a Big Sky Airlines, to suspend its subsidized essential air services at seven Montana communities on the date that Great Lakes Aviation, Ltd., begins replacement service, and selecting Great Lakes to provide those services at subsidy rates totaling $8,201,992.
 Order 2011-1-27 (February 2, 2011): selecting Gulfstream International Airlines, to provide subsidized essential air service (EAS) with 19-passenger Beechcraft B-1900D aircraft at Glasgow, Glendive, Havre, Lewistown, Miles City, Sidney, and Wolf Point, Montana, for a two-year period beginning when the carrier inaugurates full EAS at all seven communities through the end of the 24th month thereafter (two-year period ended May 31, 2013)...
 Notice (June 28, 2013): from Silver Airways of its intent to discontinue scheduled subsidized Essential Air Service between Glasgow, Glendive, Havre, Lewistown, Miles City, Sidney, Wolf Point, Montana and Billings, Montana. 
 Order 2013-6-3 (June 4, 2013): extending the contract established under Order 2011-1-27, issued on February 3, 2011, for Silver Airways, Inc. (formerly Gulfstream International Airlines), to provide Essential Air Service (EAS) operations at Lewistown, Miles City, Glasgow, Glendive, Havre, Sidney, and Wolf Point, Montana, from June 1, 2013, until further notice.
 Order 2013-9-4 (September 5, 2013): selecting Hyannis Air Service, Inc., d/b/a Cape Air, to provide Essential Air Service (EAS) with 9-passenger Cessna 402 aircraft at Glasgow, Glendive, Havre, Sidney, and Wolf Point, Montana, for a two-year period beginning December 1, 2013...
 Order 2013-12-1 (December 2, 2013): Cape Air will commence full EAS at all five of the above communities beginning December 10, 2013, thereby establishing an end date for this contract of December 31, 2015.

External links 
 

Airports in Montana
Essential Air Service
Buildings and structures in Hill County, Montana
Transportation in Hill County, Montana